Guðbjörg Inga Aradóttir FRES is an Icelandic entomologist and researcher at the National Institute of Agricultural Botany (NIAB) in the UK. Her work identifies novel crop protection solutions against insect agricultural pests and the diseases they transmit. She is particularly known for her research on plant resistance to cereal aphids and the Barley Yellow Dwarf Virus

Guðbjörg has previously worked at the Natural History Museum in London and the Icelandic Institute of Natural History. She is a fellow and trustee of the Royal Entomological Society.

References 

Living people
Women entomologists
Fellows of the Royal Entomological Society
Year of birth missing (living people)
Gudbjorg Aradottir
Gudbjorg Aradottir